Akpofure Rim-Rukeh is a Nigerian professor of Microbial Corrosion and Environmental Studies who was the former deputy Vice Chancellor of Federal University of Petroleum Resources Effurun and currently the 4th substantive Vice Chancellor of same school.

Early life and background 
Akpofure Rim-Rukeh obtained his BSc with a degree in Biochemistry from University of Port-Harcourt in 1986 and obtained Postgraduate Diploma in Chemical Engineering from University of Benin in 1993. In 1998, he got his master's degree in Chemical Engineering from the University of Port-Harcourt and obtained another Postgraduate Diploma in Education from Delta State University, Abraka in 2004. In 2008, he got his PhD in Chemical Engineering from Ruvers State University of Science and Technology.

Career 
In March 2020, Akpofure was selected by the governing council of the Federal University of Petroleum Resources, Effurun to be the Vice Chancellor which was later approved by President Mohammadu Buhari.

Personal life 
Akpofure Rim-Rukeh is married to Mercy Akpofure Rim-Rukeh and they have three kids together.

References 

Living people
Vice-Chancellors of Federal University of Petroleum Resources, Effurun
Vice-Chancellors of Nigerian universities
Nigerian academics
Nigerian academic administrators
Year of birth missing (living people)